This is an episode list from the anime Vandread. The Vandread series is composed of two seasons (Vandread, released in 2000 and Vandread: The Second Stage, released in 2001), each composed of thirteen episodes of twenty-five minutes. The first series is summarized in the Vandread Taidouhen OVA of 2001, and the second in the Vandread Gekitouhen ("Turbulence") OVA, released in 2002. There is a Vandread Extra Stage (novel), that explains the events after the last episode (#13 Trust), containing five short stories.

Episodes

Season One

Season Two

See also
 Vandread
 List of Vandread characters
 Vandread Extra Stage

Vandread